L'Enfance volée (Stolen Childhood) is a 1994 Moroccan film by Hakim Noury. It is one of Noury's most popular and influential films. The film is set in Casablanca and tells the story of the abuse of a young servant girl.

References

1994 films
Moroccan drama films